Downing Place United Reformed Church, Cambridge is a church in Cambridge, United Kingdom, that is part of the United Reformed Church.  It was formed in 2018 in a merger between St Columba's Church, Cambridge, and Emmanuel Church, Cambridge.  The church occupies the former St Columba's building in Downing Place, which is close to a site occupied by Emmanuel's congregation before 1874.

In the recent past prior to the merger of the two congregations, activities have included regular Sunday worship, a programme of music concerts, hosting an NHS group therapy centre and hosting a night-time drop-in centre hosted by Cambridge Street Pastors.  The refurbishment has been designed to facilitate similar activities.

History

Emmanuel Church

Originally a congregational church, Emmanuel voted to join the new United Reformed Church in 1972.  Emmanuel had been known by different names over the years, first as the 'Hog Hill Independent Church' and then the 'Emmanuel Congregational Chapel' or 'Emmanuel Congregational Church'.

The Emmanuel congregation was founded as the Cambridge 'Great Meeting' in 1687, at Hog Hill, the original building being there, on what is now the Old Music School in Downing Place. From 1691 the minister was Joseph Hussey; he was commemorated in the stained glass in the apse of the Emmanuel church building alongside John Greenwood, Henry Barrow, Oliver Cromwell, John Milton and Francis Holcroft. Hussey's congregation split in 1696, with some going to the meeting in Green Street, Cambridge, and again after he had left for London, in 1721, with a group founding the precursor of St Andrew's Street Baptist Church, Cambridge. The church was rebuilt on the same site, opening as Emmanuel Congregational Chapel in 1790. The move to the new church on Trumpington Street, called the Emmanuel Congregational Church, came in 1874. The old chapel was put to use from 1881 as the Balfour Biological Laboratory for Women, for female science students in the University of Cambridge.  Prior to September 2020, Emmanuel United Reformed Church occupied the Trumpington Street building. It was built to a design by the architect James Cubitt in 1875. The church was listed as Grade II in 1996.  The building was sold to Pembroke College to form part of the college's Mill Lane development project.

In the years leading up to the merger, Emmanuel organised regular Sunday worship and a programme of community activities in the recent past: a volunteer-staffed fairtrade cafe, a series of lunchtime music recitals and a share in Hope Cambridge's Churches Homeless Project. The Cambridge branch of the Open Table Network was founded here in July 2018.

St Columba's Church

St Columba's was originally a Presbyterian church.  A Presbyterian congregation was first registered in Cambridge in 1689, at that time based in Green Street.  The congregation of St Columba's was formally established in 1881, initially worshipping in Cambridge Guildhall.

The St Columba’s church building, on the corner of Downing Place and Downing Street, was built in 1891 in the Early English style to the designs of Scottish architect John Macvicar Anderson. As well as being a congregation of the Presbyterian Church of England and, from 1972, of the United Reformed Church, St Columba's was also the Chaplaincy for the Church of Scotland to the University of Cambridge; the minister's appointment as chaplain being with the concurrence of the Kirk's Presbytery of England.

In the years leading up to the merger, St Columba's, the church's programme included regular Sunday worship, hosting a group therapy centre, and a night-time drop-in centre hosted by Cambridge Street Pastors.

Merger to form Downing Place United Reformed Church
On 9 June (St Columba's Day) 2018, St Columba's Church and Emmanuel Church united to form Downing Place United Reformed Church.  The combined congregation occupies the former St Columba's building in Downing Place. The St Columba’s site has been extensively renovated as part of a £3.3 million project led by Archangel Architects.

The Emmanuel building was sold to Pembroke College, Cambridge across the road in Trumpington Street, who intended to retain it as a lecture and performance area as part of their Mill Lane redevelopment. The final service in the Emmanuel building took place on 26 July 2020 and all church activities at Trumpington Street have ceased.

While the St Columba's Church building was closed for major building works, regular worship took place in Westminster College, Cambridge. The newly restored building was rededicated in November 2021.

People

Ministers of Emmanuel Church have included:

 1738–1754 John Conder
 1767–1788 Joseph Saunders
 1806–1817 William Harris
 1848–1854 George Burder Bubier
 1859–1865 Thomas Campbell Finlayson
 1871–1872 James Ward
 1894–1901 P. T. Forsyth
 1902–1909 William Boothby Selbie
 1910–1942 Henry Child Carter
 1974-1982 Anthony (Tony) Coates
 Derek M Wales
 1997-2003 Paul Quilter
 -2014 Lance Stone
 2017-2020 John Bradbury

Ministers of St Columba's Church:
 1893-1901 Halliday Douglas
 1902-1909 G. A. Johnston Ross
 1910-1919 Robert Strachan
 1919-1925 Innes Logan
 1926-1937 George Barclay
 1938-1943 T. Ralph Morton
 1944-1960 Albert Cooper
 1961-1981 Ronald Speirs
 1982-1996 Ernest Marvin
 1997-2008 Keith Riglin
 2010-date Nigel Uden

Among the other people who have been associated with the two churches over the years, Michael Ramsey, who later became Archbishop of York, worshipped at what was then Emmanuel Congregational church as a child, where his father was a deacon. Among those listed on the Roll of Honour of Missionaries valedicted from St Columba's Church are two notable ecumenists, William Paton to India in 1919 (first general secretary of what is now the National Council of Churches in India), and Lesslie Newbigin to India in 1936 (becoming one of the first bishops of the new Church of South India in 1947). Agnes Smith Lewis and Margaret Dunlop Gibson, biblical scholars sometimes known as the "Westminster sisters" attended St Columba's and are commemorated by a plaque.

References

Further reading
The section 'Independents' describes the history of what would later become Emmanuel United Reformed Church; the section 'Presbyterians' describes what would later become St Columba's United Reformed Church.

External links
 

1687 establishments in England
19th-century churches in the United Kingdom
Religious organizations established in the 1680s
Congregational churches in Cambridgeshire
17th-century Calvinist and Reformed churches
United Reformed churches in Cambridge